was a Shinto shrine located in previously Soa-a-teng, Kagi City, Tainan Prefecture, Japanese Taiwan (modern-day Chiayi Park, Chiayi City, Taiwan).

The shrine was built on 28 October 1915 (Taishō 4) facing south but later altered in 1942 (Shōwa 17) to face west. Prince Yoshihisa, Ōnamuchi no Mikoto,  and Amaterasu were enshrined as deities.

The honden (main hall) was turned into a  Martyrs' Shrine by the Republic of China government after World War II but was destroyed in a fire on 24 April 1994. The main office and purification hall now serve as the Chiayi City Historical Relics Museum.

In 1998 the Chiayi Tower was built in place of the main hall, the design was inspired by an indigenous mythological tale about the creator of the world. In Chinese the tower is called Sun-Shooting Tower and houses an observation deck.

The area became part of Chiayi Park and the temizuya (purification pavilion), sandō (pathway), stone tōrō lantern, and Komainu statues amongst other things still exist today.

Gallery

See also
 Chiayi Cheng Huang Temple
 Chiayi Confucian Temple
 Chiayi Jen Wu Temple
 List of Shinto shrines in Taiwan

External links

 射日傳說 Legend of Sun Shooting
 嘉義市史蹟資料館 Chiayi City Historical Relics Museum

1915 establishments in Taiwan
Shinto shrines in Taiwan
Historic sites in Taiwan
Buildings and structures in Chiayi
Museums in Chiayi
20th-century Shinto shrines